Infant Island is an American screamo band formed in Fredericksburg, Virginia in 2016. The band consists of vocalist Daniel Kost, guitarists Alexander Rudenshiold and Winston Givler, bassist Kyle Guerra, and drummer Austin O'Rourke.

History

Formation and Infant Island (2016–2018) 
Infant Island was formed in the summer 2016 by vocalist Daniel Kost, guitarist Alexander Rudenshiold, bassist Kyle Guerra, and drummer James Rakestraw. On August 1, 2018, in advance of a U.S. and Canada tour, they released their self-titled debut album to critical acclaim. In the same month, the album was featured in Noisey's "Summer of Screamo" column, in which writer Dan Ozzi called it "a linchpin for modern screamo." In October 2018, the band parted ways with drummer James Rakestraw – replacing him with Austin O'Rourke who had formerly worked with bassist Guerra in smallhands, an early touring and split EP partner band for Infant Island.

In February 2019, Infant Island was featured in The Washington Post, along with contemporaries Vein and Portrayal of Guilt, as delivering "new life" to screamo.

Beneath and Sepulcher (2019–2020) 
In a March 2019 interview for RVA Magazine, guitarist Alexander Rudenshiold said that the band's second album was entirely recorded. In April 2020 the band announced that their sophomore album, Beneath, would be released in May of that year on Dog Knights Productions. They also released a music video for "Someplace Else," the last track from the album. On April 17, 2020, Infant Island released the second single for Beneath, "Stare Spells", along with a previously unannounced "miniLP" titled Sepulcher to positive reviews. Beneath was released on May 15, 2020 to positive reviews. Though chronologically it was released before Beneath, Sepulcher consists of material recorded almost a year after. Beneath was featured on several "Best of 2020" lists.

In response to the George Floyd protests, on June 5 Infant Island released a compilation album titled Collections 1, donating the proceeds to bail funds and mutual aid groups supporting protesters in Richmond and Fredericksburg, Virginia. Collections 1 contains previously unreleased tracks, reworks of songs by the band's members, as well as "rarities" from their compilation appearances and split albums.

Musical Style 
Infant Island's musical style has been universally described as screamo, and has often been compared to their regional predecessors Pg.99, City of Caterpillar, and Majority Rule. In 2018, after the release of their self-titled album, Stereogum's Chris DeVille described their style as "Deafheaven reframed in the sonic palette of Diary-era Sunny Day Real Estate." The band's 2020 releases Sepulcher and Beneath saw them shift towards a more directly metallic approach, with reviewers drawing comparisons to grindcore, sludge metal, and particularly black metal.

Band Members 
Current members
 Daniel Kost – vocals (2016–present)
 Alexander Rudenshiold – guitar/vocals (2016–present)
 Kyle Guerra - bass (2016–present)
 Austin O'Rourke - drums (2018–present)
 Winston Givler - guitar (2019–present)

Past members
 James Rakestraw – drums (2016–2018)

Discography

Studio albums

Extended plays

Compilation albums

Singles

Music videos

Compilation Appearances 
 "Ugly Brunette/July 5th" (originally by Horse Jumper of Love; Compilation "Grave Neighbors Volume 2") (2018, Middle-Man Records)
 "A Preoccupation (Reprise)" (Compilation "Sordid States Volume 2") (2019, Middle-Man Records)

References 

American emo musical groups
Musical groups established in 2016
American screamo musical groups
Emo revival groups
American post-metal musical groups
Hardcore punk groups from Virginia
2016 establishments in Virginia